The 2014 New Zealand Labour Party leadership election was held to choose the Leader of the Labour Party. Andrew Little won the election and became leader of the party.

The election followed the resignation of leader David Cunliffe on 27 September 2014 after an historic general election defeat a week earlier. David Parker and Annette King were installed as interim leader and deputy leader, respectively. Nominations for the leadership closed on 14 October, and Labour Party members met the candidates in 14 hustings meetings throughout the country. The results of the contest were announced on 18 November. Under Labour Party rules, party members have 40% of the votes, caucus members have another 40% of the votes, and affiliated unions have 20% of the votes.

David Cunliffe was the first person to put forward their nomination, but he later withdrew from the contest on 13 October. Candidates, in the order of their nominations being put forward, were Grant Robertson, Andrew Little, David Parker and Nanaia Mahuta.

Background 
The Labour Party has remained in opposition since the Fifth Labour Government was voted out in the 2008 general election. The Labour Party's leader, Helen Clark, resigned on election night and was replaced days later by long-serving MP and former Cabinet minister Phil Goff. Labour's vote decreased to 27% at the 2011 general election and Goff subsequently resigned. The leadership election later that year saw David Shearer beat David Cunliffe in a vote of the party's caucus. In 2012 the party rewrote its leadership rules, giving the party's parliamentary caucus 40% of the vote, the party membership 40% and affiliated unions 20%, and using instant-runoff voting if there are more than two candidates. In 2013 Shearer resigned as party leader and the Labour Party elected Cunliffe as its parliamentary leader over Grant Robertson and Shane Jones.

2014 general election
The 2014 general election took place on 20 September, and the Fifth National Government was re-elected for a third term. Labour's defeat was of historical proportions; it was, based on interim results of 24.69% for the party vote the worst result since , when Labour gained 23.70% of the vote in its second general election after the formation of the party in 1916.

Calls for Cunliffe's resignation appeared the day after the election from caucus colleagues, and political commentators pointed out that Cunliffe provided a long list of reasons in his concession speech why Labour had failed to win the election, but that he had failed to point the finger at himself. According to political journalist Andrea Vance, the concession speech was written the day before the election, when the magnitude of the defeat was of course yet unknown. When pressed, Cunliffe refused to resign and rather wanted his caucus colleagues to pass a motion of no confidence, but a no confidence motion was unlikely, as likely contenders would not want to be rushed, and the caucus agreed that no action would be taken until the final election results are released on 4 October. That Cunliffe was not in control of the caucus, with a large majority of caucus members known as not supporting Cunliffe, became clear when Chris Hipkins was elected whip in the 23 September caucus meeting. Whips are supposed to be "loyal lieutenants" to the leader, but Hipkins is a known opponent of Cunliffe, and one of Cunliffe's first actions after his 2013 leadership election was to demote Hipkins.

Cunliffe tendered his resignation on 27 September, triggering the leadership election.

2014 leadership election and interim leadership
While the new leader of the Labour Party was being determined, David Parker and Annette King became leader and deputy leader of the Party.

Nominations for the leadership closed on 14 October. Between 22 October and 11 November, 14 hustings meetings were held throughout the country for members of the Labour Party. Voting by the Labour membership was possible through the post and online, and the election result were scheduled for announcement on 18 November 2014.

It is the second leadership election the Party conducted using new party rules agreed in 2012, which allow party members to vote. The Labour Party election rules state that the vote is split among the party's caucus, party members and party affiliates (unions) in a 40/40/20 split.

Candidates

Grant Robertson
Robertson announced on 27 September that he would contest the leadership election, stating that he "couldn't stand by and see the party poll 24% and not put my name forward". Robertson was formally nominated on 10 October by Kris Faafoi and Rino Tirikatene.

Andrew Little
Andrew Little announced his bid on 9 October 2014. He was nominated by Poto Williams and Iain Lees-Galloway.

David Parker
After ruling himself out of the contest in September, Parker became the interim leader of the Labour Party on 30 October. By 12 October, he had changed his mind and announced his leadership bid. Parker was nominated by Jenny Salesa and Damien O'Connor.

Nanaia Mahuta
Mahuta announced her candidacy half an hour before nominations closed on 14 October 2014. She was nominated by Louisa Wall and William Sio.

Non-standing prospects
David Cunliffe initially announced on 27 September that he was resigning as leader of the party and that he was going to contest the subsequent election for a new leader. However, on 13 October, he announced he would not run for the leadership and put his personal support behind Little.

Others speculated to have considered contesting the election included former leader David Shearer.
Shearer however ruled himself out. Stuart Nash was also speculated as a candidate but ruled himself out on 5 October. A poll by Television New Zealand's One News in late September 2014 suggested that Jacinda Ardern would gain support from the public.

Result
Andrew Little won the leadership contest and became leader of the Labour Party, receiving 50.52 per cent of the vote to Grant Robertson's 49.48 per cent in the final round of the voting reallocations. As a result of the leadership election, Grant Robertson said after two unsuccessful attempts he would not seek the Labour leadership again in the future. David Parker would not answer questions about his future in Parliament, but signalled that he was not interested in retaining the finance portfolio.

Notes

References

External links
"Meet Labour's leadership hopefuls", Radio New Zealand National, 15 October 2014

Labour Party leadership
2014
New Zealand Labour Party leadership election